The Rambling Ranger is a 1927 American silent Western film directed by Dell Henderson and written by George Hively. The film stars Jack Hoxie, Dorothy Gulliver, C.E. Anderson, Monty Montague Jr., Charles Avery and Monte Montague. The film was released on April 10, 1927, by Universal Pictures.

Cast
 Jack Hoxie as Hank Kinney
 Dorothy Gulliver as Ruth Buxley
 C.E. Anderson as Sam Bruce
 Monty Montague Jr. as Royal Highness
 Charles Avery as Seth Buxley
 Monte Montague as Sheriff Boy

References

External links
 

1927 films
1927 Western (genre) films
Universal Pictures films
Films directed by Dell Henderson
American black-and-white films
Silent American Western (genre) films
1920s English-language films
1920s American films